The 25th Academy Awards were held on March 19, 1953 at the RKO Pantages Theatre in Hollywood, and the NBC International Theatre in New York City, to honor the films of 1952. It was the first Oscars ceremony to be televised, the first ceremony to be held in Hollywood and New York simultaneously, and the only year in which the New York ceremonies were held in the NBC International Theatre on Columbus Circle, which was shortly thereafter demolished and replaced by the New York Coliseum.

The year saw a major upset when the heavily favored High Noon lost Best Picture to Cecil B. DeMille's The Greatest Show on Earth, eventually considered among the worst films to have won the award. Today, it ranks #94 on Rotten Tomatoes' list of the 95 films to win Best Picture, ahead of only The Broadway Melody. 

Although it only received two nominations, Singin' in the Rain went on to be named as the greatest American musical film of all time and in the 2007 American Film Institute updated list as the fifth greatest American film of all time, while High Noon ranked twenty-seventh on the same list.

The Bad and the Beautiful won five Oscars, the most wins ever for a film not nominated for Best Picture. It was also the second—and, to date, last—Academy Awards in which a film not nominated for Best Picture received the most awards of the evening, excluding years where there were ties for the most wins.

Until Spotlight won only Best Picture and Best Original Screenplay at the 88th Academy Awards, this was the last year in which the Best Picture winner won just two total Oscars. It was also the second of three years to date in which two films not nominated for Best Picture received more nominations than the winner (The Bad and the Beautiful and Hans Christian Andersen, both with six). This occurred again at the 79th Academy Awards.

Shirley Booth was the last person born in the 19th century to win an Oscar in a Leading Role, and the first woman in her 50s to win Best Actress, at the age of 54 (the second woman in her 50s to win, Julianne Moore, was also 54 when she won at the 87th Academy Awards).

John Ford's fourth win for Best Director set a record for the most wins in this category that remains unmatched to this day.

For the first time since the introduction of Supporting Actor and Actress awards in 1936, Best Picture, Best Director, and all four acting Oscars were awarded to six different films. This has happened only three times since, at the 29th Academy Awards for 1956, the 78th for 2005, and the 85th for 2012.

Awards

Nominees were announced on February 9, 1953. Winners are listed first and highlighted in boldface.

Academy Honorary Awards
George Alfred Mitchell "for the design and development of the camera which bears his name and for his continued and dominant presence in the field of cinematography".
Joseph M. Schenck "for long and distinguished service to the motion picture industry".
Merian C. Cooper "for his many innovations and contributions to the art of motion pictures".
Harold Lloyd "master comedian and good citizen".
Bob Hope "for his contribution to the laughter of the world, his service to the motion picture industry, and his devotion to the American premise".
 Plymouth Adventure for Best Special Effects.

Best Foreign Language Film
Forbidden Games (France)

Irving G. Thalberg Memorial Award
Cecil B. DeMille

Films with multiple nominations and awards

Presenters and performers

Presenters

Performers

Broadcast
The 25th Academy Awards ceremony was the first to be broadcast on television:
For the first time in history, a television audience estimated at 40,000,000 persons will watch the movie industry's biggest show. It will mark the TV debut for scores of the biggest names in moviedom.

The telecast was prompted by the need to finance the bi-coastal ceremony. When three of the film studios refused to provide their customary financial support, the RCA Victor Division of the Radio Corporation of America agreed to pay AMPAS $100,000 (one source reported $250,000) as a sponsorship fee. NBC telecast the bicoastal ceremony over its 64-station television network and on its 174-station radio system. The Armed Forces Radio Service recorded the proceedings for later broadcast . While in the United States the show was televised live on NBC, in Canada the live show was broadcast on CCTV installed at several movie theaters in Montreal and Toronto relaying NBC's feed. In Mexico City, XHGC-TV had to broadcast a 'Kinephoto' of the ceremony (sponsored there by Kraft Foods and RCA Victor) the following night because no TV network in that country had a station in the U.S.-Mexico border until 1955. In the United Kingdom (which used a different television standard as opposed to the US 525-line television system), the BBC Television Service had to broadcast a film recording of the televised ceremony on March 21. With videotape technology still in its infancy, U.K. television standards conversion different from the U.S. and satellite broadcasting still a decade away, a live broadcast to Europe was impossible.

The show was broadcast from 10:30 p.m. to 12:15 am, switching back and forth from host Bob Hope on the West Coast to Conrad Nagel on the East Coast. The late start was made to accommodate those nominees who were performing that night on the Broadway stage.

The technology used for television at the time meant that Bob Hope had to wear a blue dress shirt with his formal dinner jacket; the traditional white shirt would have been too bright.

See also
10th Golden Globe Awards
1952 in film
 4th Primetime Emmy Awards
 5th Primetime Emmy Awards
 6th British Academy Film Awards
 7th Tony Awards

References and footnotes

Academy Awards ceremonies
1952 film awards
1953 in American cinema
1953 in Los Angeles
1953 in New York City
Events in New York City
March 1953 events in the United States
1950s in Manhattan
Columbus Circle